Never Saw It Coming is a 2017 Canadian thriller film directed by Gail Harvey and starring Emily Hampshire, Eric Roberts, Katie Boland, Shaun Benson, Tamara Podemski and Nick Serino.  It is based on the 2013 novel by Linwood Barclay, who also wrote the screenplay.

Cast

Production
Principal photography began in Greater Sudbury in March 2017.  Filming officially wrapped in April that same year.

Release
The film made its world premiere at the Whistler Film Festival on December 1, 2017.

Reception
Barry Hertz of The Globe and Mail awarded the film one and a half stars out of four and wrote, "Perhaps director Gail Harvey is the true author of this misfortune, with its rushed scenes and staging that only highlights, rather than deflects, the film's made-for-TV budget."

Norman Wilner of Now gave the film a positive review and wrote, "Adapted by Linwood Barclay from his own novel, it’s a Fargo-like swirl of misunderstandings, betrayals and reversals of fortune, with a streak of bitter humour underneath the mayhem."

References

External links
 
 
 Never Saw It Coming at Library and Archives Canada

2017 films
2017 thriller films
Canadian thriller films
English-language Canadian films
2010s English-language films
2010s Canadian films